Orthogonius lancangjiang is a species of ground beetle in the subfamily Orthogoniinae. It was described by Tian & Deuve in 2006. This species resides mainly in Southeast Asia in Vietnam and Laos.

References

lancangjiang
Beetles described in 2006